Shirley Ann Barlow is a classicist specialising in the study of Classical drama and was one of the founding members of the Department of Classics at the University of Kent. One of her former students is comedian Alan Davies. She was an Honorary Fellow of University College London.

Career
Barlow started at the University of Kent in 1965 as a Lecturer in Classics. She eventually gained promotion to Senior Lecturer and was, subsequently, head of the Classics department there. She was Master of Eliot College, Kent and a seminar room in Eliot College is named after her. One of her students in 1986 was the comedian Alan Davies who described Barlow, in his 2009 book My favourite people and me: 1978-1988, as the best teacher he had at Kent whilst describing her as "engaging, and knowledgeable and [someone who] inspired commitment to her subject, classical drama".

Barlow was a member of the Soroptimist International organisation and acted as the president of the Canterbury branch in 1986-1987. She was awarded an Honorary Fellowship to the University College London in 1988.

Selected publications
Barlow, S. A. 1971. The Imagery of Euripides. London.
Barlow, S. A. 1981. "Sophocles' Ajax and Euripides' Heracles", Ramus 10(2), 112-128.
Barlow, S. A. 1982. "Structure and Dramatic Realism in Euripides' Heracles", Greece & Rome" 29(2) 115-125. 
Barlow, S. A. 1986. Euripides Trojan Women. Warminster, Aris & Phillips. 
Barlow, S. A. 1989. "Stereotype and Reversal in Euripides' Medea", Greece & Rome 36(2), 158-171.
Barlow, S. A. 1996. Euripides: Heracles''. Warminster, Aris & Phillips.

References

Women classical scholars
Year of birth missing (living people)
Living people